Dendrophilia petrinopsis is a moth of the family Gelechiidae. It is found in Russia (Primorsky Krai), Japan (Honshu) and Taiwan.

References

Moths described in 1935
petrinopsis
Moths of Japan